Sandra Zimmerli (born 1965) from Panex VD is a Swiss ski mountaineer and radio journalist.

Especially in teams with Catherine Mabillard she competed successfully in the 1990s and early 2000s (decade), before she had to withdraw from sports due to an injury. In 2009, she returned to competition ski mountaineering sports.

As a journalist she worked for Radio Chablais and currently for La 1ère.

Selected results 
 1994:
 1st, Patrouille de la Maya A-course, together with Catherine Mabillard and Marika Ducret
 1997:
 1st, Trophée du Muveran (together with Catherine Mabillard and Marianne Chapuisat)
 1st, ski marathon (together with Catherine Mabillard), Matterhorn, Zermatt
 1998:
 1st and course record, Tour de Matterhorn (together with Catherine Mabillard and Cristina Favre-Moretti)
 1st, Super-Trophée du Muveran (together with Catherine Mabillard)
 1999:
 1st, Alpiniski des Dents-du-Midi (together with Catherine Mabillard)
 2001:
 1st, European Championship team race (together with Catherine Mabillard)
 2009:
 3rd, Pila Race in the Sky at night (together with Catherine Mabillard)

Patrouille des Glaciers 

 1998: 1st and course record, together with Catherine Mabillard and Cristina Favre-Moretti
 2000: 1st, together with Catherine Mabillard and Cristina Favre-Moretti

References 

1965 births
Living people
Swiss female ski mountaineers
Swiss radio journalists
Women radio journalists
Swiss women journalists